Alloclemensia is a genus of moths of the family Incurvariidae.

Selected species
 Alloclemensia americana Nielsen, 1981
 Alloclemensia devotella (Rebel, 1893)
 Alloclemensia maculata Nielsen, 1981
 Alloclemensia mesospilella (Herrich-Schaffer, 1854)
 Alloclemensia minima Kozlov, 1987
 Alloclemensia unifasciata Nielsen, 1981

References
 Alloclemensia at funet

Incurvariidae
Adeloidea genera